The 1919 Michigan State Normal Normalites football team was an American football team that represented Michigan State Normal College (later renamed Eastern Michigan University) as an independent during the 1919 college football season.  In their second non-consecutive season under head coach Elton Rynearson, the Normalites compiled a 4–2–1 record and outscored opponents by a total of 73 to 44. Clifford D. Crane was the team captain.

Schedule

References

Michigan State Normal
Eastern Michigan Eagles football seasons
Michigan State Normal Normalites football